Castlerea St Kevin's GAA is a Gaelic Athletic Association club located in Castlerea, County Roscommon, Ireland. The club was founded in 1968 and its dominant sport is Gaelic football.

Honours
Roscommon Senior Football Championships:  1967, 1968, 1971, 1973, 2003, 2008, 2009
Connacht Senior Football Championships: 1968

References

Gaelic games clubs in County Roscommon
Gaelic football clubs in County Roscommon